Bjørn Gunnar Olsen (7 April 1942 – 1992) was a Norwegian journalist, novelist, playwright and biographer.

Career
Olsen made his literary debut in 1967 with Ved skjulestedet. Among his novels are Hud over Damhauen from 1982, and Alfreds hus from 1986. Other works include a biography of Martin Tranmæl, biographies of sportspeople, and plays.

He was awarded Mads Wiel Nygaards Endowment in 1972.

Personal life
Olsen was born in Halden on 7 April 1942. He died in 1992.

References

1942 births
1992 deaths
People from Halden
Norwegian biographers
Male biographers
20th-century Norwegian novelists
20th-century Norwegian dramatists and playwrights
20th-century biographers
Norwegian male novelists
Norwegian male dramatists and playwrights
20th-century Norwegian male writers
20th-century Norwegian journalists